The North Star: Finding Black Mecca is a 2021 Canadian documentary film about the Black Canadian communities of Chatham, Dresden and Buxton in Ontario. The film is almost entirely narrated by community members themselves, with some input from academics who have studied the settlements. The film highlights the self-sufficiency of the local Black community, the early civil rights work of the National Unity Association, the Chatham Coloured All-Stars, as well as the international influence of local figures including Mary Ann Shadd and Fergie Jenkins. The film's title song Summer Night Songs is performed by singer Chudi Harris and 2020 Polaris Music Prize nominee Aquakultre.

The North Star: Finding Black Mecca won awards at the Niagara Falls International Film Festival, Canada Shorts Film Festival and screened at festivals around Canada and the U.S., including the Seattle Black Film Festival, the Montreal International Film Festival, Roxbury Film Festival, CaribbeanTales International Film Festival and the Denton Black Film Festival in Texas.

The film was self-funded by the producers, and later picked up by the CBC. The North Star: Finding Black Mecca premiered on CBC Television on September 18, 2021.

References

External links
 

English-language Canadian films
2021 documentary films
2021 films
Canadian documentary films
Documentary films about Canadian politics
Films set in Ontario
Documentary films about Black Canadians
Works about the Underground Railroad
2020s English-language films
2020s Canadian films